Peeter Olesk may refer to:

* Peeter Olesk (literary scientist) (born 1953), Estonian literary scientist, critic and politician
 Peeter Olesk (sport shooter) (born 1993), Estonian sport shooter